Nachtjagdgeschwader 6 (NJG 6) was a Luftwaffe night fighter-wing of World War II. NJG 6 was formed in May 1943.

Commanding officers
Major Fritz Schaffer, 10 August 1943 – 8 February 1944
Major Heinrich Wohlers, 9 February 1944 – 15 March 1944
Major Heinz von Reeken, 16 March 1944 – 14 April 1944
Major Heinrich Griese, 15 April 1944 – 12 September 1944
Oberstleutnant Herbert Lütje, 13 September 1944 – 8 May 1945

References

Citations

Bibliography

 
 

Nachtjagdgeschwader 006
Military units and formations established in 1943
Military units and formations disestablished in 1945